Thomas Barrow may refer to:

 Thomas Barrow (pirate) (died 1726), English pirate based in New Providence
 Thomas Barrow (Jesuit) (1747–1813), British Jesuit
 Thomas Barrow (politician) (1916–1982), politician in Manitoba, Canada
 Thomas Barrow (artist) (born 1938), American artist
 Thomas Barrow (Downton Abbey), character on the television show Downton Abbey

See also
 Thomas Barowe (died 1497), ecclesiastic and judge